The Journal of Modern Optics is a peer-reviewed scientific journal that was established as Optica Acta in 1954. It obtained its current name in 1987 and is published by Taylor & Francis with 21 issues per year. The journal covers most branches of classical and quantum optics including lasers, diffraction, holographs, nonlinear optics, and photon statistics. The editor-in-chief is Thomas Brown (University of Rochester). According to the Journal Citation Reports, the journal has a 2021 impact factor of 1.293.

References

External links 

Publications established in 1954
Taylor & Francis academic journals
English-language journals
Optics journals